Jheimy da Silva Carvalho (born August 6, 1988 in Jacundá), is a Brazilian footballer who acts as a striker. Currently plays for São Bento.

Career
Jheimy Carvalho da Silva is a football striker revealed in the basic categories of Itaberaí Union, the State of Goiás club after stints in clubs in North and Northeast of the country, came to Atletico for a period of testing mid-2010. After approval of coach Vanderlei Luxemburgo was hired on July 29.

Career statistics
(Correct )

Contract
 Atlético Mineiro.

References

External links
 galodigital
 futpedia
 superesportes
 terra
 Atlético

1988 births
Living people
Brazilian footballers
Clube Atlético Mineiro players
Sport Club do Recife players
ABC Futebol Clube players
Oeste Futebol Clube players
Campeonato Brasileiro Série A players
Campeonato Brasileiro Série B players
Association football forwards